Nawabganj Sadar is an upazila of Nawabganj District in the Division of Rajshahi, Bangladesh.

Geography
It has 65158 households and total area 451.8 km2.

Chapai Nawabganj Sadar Upazila is bounded by Shibganj, Chapai Nawabganj and Nachole Upazilas on the north, Tanore and Godagari Upazilas, in Rajshahi District, on the east, Samserganj, Suti I, Suti II, Raghunathganj II and Lalgola CD Blocks, in Murshidabad district, West Bengal, India, all across the Ganges/ Padma, on the south, and Shibganj Upazila, Chapai Nawabganj on the west.

Demographics
According to 2011 Bangladesh census, Chapai Nawabganj Sadar had a population of 530,592. Males constituted 47.99% of the population and females 52.01%. Muslims formed 95.64% of the population, Hindus 3.89%, Christians 0.23% and others 0.23%. Chapai Nawabganj Sadar had a literacy rate of 46.3% for the population 7 years and above.

As of the 1991 Bangladesh census, Nawabganj Sadar has a population of 389524. Males constitute 50.39% of the population, and females 49.61%. This Upazila's eighteen up population is 187893. Nawabganj Sadar has an average literacy rate of 27.1% (7+ years), and the national average of 32.4% literate.

Administration
Chapai Nawabganj Sadar Upazila is divided into Nawabganj Municipality and 14 union parishads: Alatuli, Baliadanga, Baroghoria, Charaunupnagar, Charbagdanga, Debinagar, Gobratola, Islampur, Jhilim, Moharajpur, Narayanpur, Ranihati, Shahjahanpur, and Sundarpur. The union parishads are subdivided into 174 mauzas and 203 villages.

Nawabganj Town (Municipality) is subdivided into 15 wards and 82 mahallas.

Education

According to Banglapedia, Harimohon Government High School, founded in 1895, is a notable secondary school.

See also
Upazilas of Bangladesh
Districts of Bangladesh
Divisions of Bangladesh

References

Upazilas of Chapai Nawabganj District